Radek Štěpánek (born 27 November 1978) is a Czech former professional tennis player. His career-high singles ranking was world No. 8 and best doubles ranking was world No. 4. Štěpánek's biggest achievements are reaching two Masters 1000 event finals and the quarterfinals of Wimbledon in 2006, as well as winning the deciding match for Czech Republic's Davis Cup winning team in 2012 and again in 2013. In doubles, he won his first Grand Slam title at the 2012 Australian Open, along with Indian partner Leander Paes, defeating the Bryan Brothers in the final. Paes and Štěpánek also won the men's doubles title at the 2013 US Open, defeating Bruno Soares and Alexander Peya in the final. In November 2017, he became a coach of Novak Djokovic and in May 2019, he joined Andre Agassi as part of Grigor Dimitrov's coaching staff.

Early life
Born in Karviná, Moravia-Silesia, Štěpánek began playing tennis at age three with his father Vlastimil, who was a tennis coach.
Štěpánek's brother is a policeman and his mother a librarian. His cousin is Jaromír Blažek, who represented the Czech Republic as a football goalkeeper. Štěpánek grew up admiring Czech tennis player Ivan Lendl, particularly noting "he was the one who brought professionalism to the sport with his conditioning."

Career
Štěpánek turned professional in 1996. He started on tour as a doubles specialist, winning 12 ATP titles. Since 2002, Štěpánek has focused on being a better singles player while still playing top-level doubles. He is known for his after-the-shot grunting, his over-the-top celebrations and his many relationships with WTA players.

Štěpánek first came to mainstream notice when he defeated former World No. 1 Gustavo Kuerten in five sets on his way to the third round of the 2003 Australian Open.

2006: First ATP title & Wimbledon quarterfinal
2006 was Štěpánek's best year to date; he found himself on the verge of getting into the top ten of ATP rankings, as he defeated José Acasuso in the semi-finals of the Masters Series event in Hamburg. He went on to lose the final in straight sets against Spain's Tommy Robredo. At that point, he achieved a career-high ATP world ranking of No. 11 in singles.

Earlier in 2006, he won his first ATP singles title, beating Christophe Rochus in Rotterdam, but he had yet to progress beyond the third round of a Grand Slam tournament until he got into the quarter-finals at Wimbledon beating Frank Dancevic, Xavier Malisse, Juan Carlos Ferrero and Fernando Verdasco, before he was eliminated by 34-year-old Jonas Björkman, after holding match point at 7–6 in the fourth-set tie-break.

This performance helped Štěpánek break into the top 10 and achieve his highest world ranking of no. 8. However, after Wimbledon, Štěpánek was out of action for the rest of the year due to a chronic neck injury.

2007: 2nd ATP title
In the second round of the 2007 US Open, Štěpánek played a match against third seed Novak Djokovic, which he ended up losing after 4 hours and 44 minutes of play in a fifth-set tiebreak.

Earlier in 2007, he won his second ATP singles title, beating James Blake in Los Angeles in three sets.

2008
In 2008, he achieved some good results such as reaching the final in San Jose, but losing to Andy Roddick. He also made it to the semifinals in the Rome Masters, losing to Novak Djokovic after he retired due to heat exhaustion. In the 2008 Summer Olympics, he lost to Michaël Llodra in the first round in three sets. Štěpánek finished the season ranked no. 27, but attended the year-end Masters Cup as an alternate. He was vacationing in Thailand and so was able to come to the tournament held in Shanghai without delay. Since he did not have his own tennis gear which got stuck in customs (they were sent from home), he had to borrow a racquet from Novak Djokovic and socks from Andy Murray. After Andy Roddick pulled out due to injury before his second match, Štěpánek entered the tournament with two round-robin ties to play against Roger Federer and Gilles Simon. He gave the second seed Federer a tough match, but lost. He was also beaten by Simon.

2009: 3rd & 4th ATP titles
Štěpánek started his 2009 season at the Brisbane International with a new Bosworth racquet, where he claimed his third ATP title after coming back from a set down to defeat Fernando Verdasco in the final. Then, at the Australian Open, he made it to the third round and was overpowered by Verdasco in straight sets.

At the SAP Open in San Jose, he won his fourth ATP singles title, beating American Mardy Fish in a three-set final. He also snapped a four-match losing streak in the tournament against Andy Roddick, upsetting him in the semifinals. He also captured the doubles title teaming up with German Tommy Haas, making it his first time to win the singles and doubles titles at the same tournament.

In the Davis Cup first round tie against France, he lost his opening match to Jo-Wilfried Tsonga in straight sets. However, he regained his confidence and won the doubles rubber the next day and his second singles match against Gilles Simon in straight sets to give the Czech Republic a berth in the quarterfinals. Then, in the Davis Cup quarterfinals, he won the deciding fifth rubber to lead his country to the semifinals. In the semifinals, Štěpánek battled Ivo Karlović to victory in a marathon opener in which the 82 games played equalled the highest number in a Davis Cup rubber since the introduction of the tiebreak in 1989.
In that match, he was aced 78 times, but overall hit more winners, over 170 (including service winners). The match was one of the longest in the history of the Davis Cup, lasting 5 hours and 59 minutes. There were only three breaks of serve in the match.
In the finals of the Davis Cup versus Spain, Štěpánek lost to David Ferrer after being two sets up. The Czech Republic lost 5–0 to Spain.

2010
Štěpánek returned to the Brisbane International to defend his title. He made a second final appearance, but failed to defend the title, losing to Andy Roddick in straight sets. He also teamed up with Tomáš Berdych to reach the doubles quarterfinals, only to lose to eventual champions Jérémy Chardy and Marc Gicquel. Seeded 13th at the 2010 Australian Open, he lost in the first round to Ivo Karlović in five sets.

2011: 5th ATP title
Štěpánek began the 2011 season with a third successive appearance at the 2011 Brisbane International, hoping for a third successive finals appearance, despite only being ranked no. 62. For the first round he was drawn against world no. 67, German Tobias Kamke. Despite struggling for the first set, he eventually won, 5–7, 6–1, 6–4, to set up a second-round match against Mardy Fish, the fourth seed in the tournament. Štěpánek blazed through the match, thrashing the world no. 16 Fish, 6–3, 6–1. In the quarterfinals against seventh seed and world no. 37 Florian Mayer, he had a dominant start, leading 5–1 in the first set, before Mayer managed to break his serve. However, he continued his winning streak, emerging victorious, 6–3, 6–3, to place himself in the first semifinal against Robin Söderling, where he lost.

Štěpánek exited the 2011 French Open in the first round, losing in straight sets to Frenchman Richard Gasquet. He defeated Gaël Monfils in the final of the Legg Mason Tennis Classic.

2012: Australian Open doubles title
In January 2012, Štěpánek won the Australian Open Men's doubles title, partnering Leander Paes. They beat top seeds Bob and Mike Bryan in the final.

In April 2012, Serbia's Janko Tipsarević defeated him in five sets to level the Davis Cup quarterfinal at 1–1, after a stormy five-hour match.
Tipsarević, Serbia's top player in the absence of world no. 1 Novak Djokovic, saved three match points before securing victory.
After the match, Tipsarević accused Štěpánek of using his middle finger inappropriately during their handshake and calling him a "stinky bastard". Štěpánek denied that he did either of these things, and none of the footage taken at the match showed clearly what happened. An online photo of the hands of both players showed Štěpánek's finger folded in, but Štěpánek claims the picture was taken after he was already pulling his hand back. Neither this photo nor footage provided by a Czech TV station conclusively support Tipsarević's version of the events. Štěpánek later stated that what he actually said to Tipsarević was "You don't need to cheat", referring to Tipsarević's winning a point after the ball had bounced twice and erasing a mark before the chair umpire could check whether the ball was in or out.

Štěpánek and Paes made it to the finals of US Open, this time losing to the Bryan brothers in straight sets.
On 7 November 2012, Štěpánek and Leander Paes started off with a win in the ATP world tour tournament.

He won the Davis Cup together with Tomáš Berdych against Spain playing both singles and doubles. In the Hollywood-script-like final in Prague, Štěpánek won the decisive rubber against Nicolás Almagro, at the time ranked 21 spots above Štěpánek on the ATP ranking ladder, becoming only the second player 30 or older to win a deciding Davis Cup final match in the history of the competition.

2013: US Open doubles title
Štěpánek underwent neck surgery on 21 January to relieve pressure where a disc was pressing on a nerve rendering his right hand numb and weak.
He recovered well and won US Open in doubles with Leander Paes.

Later in the year, at New York, he won his second major double title, again with Paes. They defeated the top seeds Mike and Bob Bryan in the semifinals, ending their streak of four major titles. Paes and Štěpánek went on to defeat the second seeds Bruno Soares and Alexander Peya in straight sets in the finals.

In the Davis Cup semifinal, he helped the Czech Republic beat Argentina as he beat Juan Mónaco in the opening singles match and continued to win the doubles with Berdych. In the final against Serbia, he won the doubles and the deciding singles match to defend their title.  He became the first person in Davis Cup history to win consecutive live deciding singles rubbers.

2014: Return to top 40
Štěpánek played on the successful Czech Davis Cup that beat the Netherlands at home in the first round and Japan on the road in the quarterfinals.

Štěpánek then had an impressive run in the AEGON Championships, defeating Mikhail Kukushkin, Bernard Tomic, and then 2013's champion Andy Murray. He then took out Kevin Anderson in the quarterfinals, before losing to the eventual runner-up, Feliciano López.

He also reached the semifinals in the 250 event in Bogota, Colombia, losing to Ivo Karlović.

The rest of his singles season was disappointing, and he did not play any singles tournaments after the US Open. In August he brought his ranking up to no. 35.

In doubles, he reached the quarterfinals in Rome and London, before reaching the semifinals at Wimbledon partnering Leander Paes, where they lost to Vasek Pospisil and Jack Sock, the eventual champions.

2015
In the first half of the year, Štěpánek played mostly in Challenger events. He lost in the second round of the French Open to Tomáš Berdych.

2016: Australian Open Doubles runner-up and Olympics mixed doubles bronze medal
On 30 January 2016, Štěpánek and his doubles partner, Daniel Nestor, were defeated by Jamie Murray and Bruno Soares in a three-set match in the 2016 Australian Open final.

At 2016 Summer Olympics in Rio de Janeiro, Štěpánek won bronze medal in mixed doubles with partner Lucie Hradecká. They defeated Indian pair of Sania Mirza and Rohan Bopanna.

2017: Retirement
In 2017 Stepanek underwent back surgery after the Australian Open. He did not play again and chose to retire in November.

Playing style

Štěpánek is noted for being one of the few serve and volley players on the tour. He is known for his resilience at the net as well as his entertaining and at times comedic plays during matches. Štěpánek has a strong and accurate first serve, often reaching up to 210 km/h with it. Like most serve and volley players, Štěpánek's second serve is slower, but has a great amount of top-spin, giving him time to come up to the net. On his serve, Štěpánek often immediately comes up to the net and volleys, finishing off points quickly. His net play is considered one of the best on the tour. He is known for his reach and anticipation at the net, which allows him to put away would-be passing shots at the net as well as engage in volley-to-volley exchanges, often coming out on top.

However, unlike most serve and volley players, Štěpánek usually does not employ a Chip and charge form of play when receiving. Instead, he engages in baseline rallies. His groundstrokes are not exceptionally powerful, but are consistent and accurate on both wings, allowing him to maintain solid ground at the baseline. If caught up too long in a baseline rally, however, Štěpánek will often place a deep, accurate groundstroke or a drop-shot and come up to the net to volley, finishing off the point quickly. He is often more willing to use a slice than his double-handed backhand.

One of the signature characteristics of Štěpánek is his comedic and entertaining play. Due to the fact that he comes up to the net a lot, he often employs unconventional shots, as well as the occasional trick shot.

Personal life

Štěpánek was engaged to Swiss tennis star Martina Hingis, but they split up in August 2007. He married former top-ten Czech tennis player Nicole Vaidišová in 2010. They separated in 2013. For several months, he dated Czech Wimbledon Champion Petra Kvitová. They split in April 2014. In 2018, he married Vaidišová again, and they have a daughter Stella.

Štěpánek was coached by former Australian Open champion Petr Korda. He endorses ALEA clothing and Nike shoes and was sponsored by Bosworth racquets but later was seen also using Head racquets.

Czech football goalkeeper Jaromír Blažek is his cousin. His (half) brother-in-law is American tennis player Toby Kodat.

Significant finals

Grand Slam finals

Doubles: 5 (2–3)

Masters 1000 finals

Singles: 2 (0–2)

Doubles: 2 (2–0)

Olympic medal matches

Mixed Doubles: (1 Bronze medal)

ATP career finals

Singles: 12 (5 titles, 7 runner-ups)

Doubles: 33 (18 titles, 15 runner-ups)

Performance timelines

''As of 2017 Australian Open.

Singles

Doubles

Top-10 wins per season

References

External links

Štěpánek world ranking history

1978 births
Living people
Czech expatriate sportspeople in Monaco
Czech male tennis players
Olympic tennis players of the Czech Republic
Sportspeople from Karviná
People from Monte Carlo
Tennis players at the 2008 Summer Olympics
Tennis players at the 2012 Summer Olympics
Tennis players at the 2016 Summer Olympics
Grand Slam (tennis) champions in men's doubles
Olympic bronze medalists for the Czech Republic
Olympic medalists in tennis
Medalists at the 2016 Summer Olympics
Novak Djokovic coaches
Australian Open (tennis) champions
US Open (tennis) champions